The Lotec Sirius is a sports car built by German automotive company Lotec in 2000. It can go from 0-100 km/h (62 mph) in 3.8 seconds.

References

Sports cars
Cars introduced in 2000

Rear mid-engine, rear-wheel-drive vehicles